Cudonia is a genus of fungi within the family Cudoniaceae. The genus is widespread in temperate regions and has an unknown edibility.

References

Leotiomycetes genera